

Tigranocerta (Tigranόkerta; Tigranakert), also called Cholimma or Chlomaron in antiquity, was a city and the capital of the Armenian Kingdom between 77 and 69 BCE. It bore the name of Tigranes the Great, who founded the city in the first century BC. There is so far no common agreement on the precise location of Tigranakert; it was either near present-day Silvan, Arzan (Arzn, in the Armenian province of Arzanene or Aghdznik), east of Diyarbakır, Turkey, or in the valley of the Garzan river mentioned by T. A. Sinclair. It was one of four cities in historic Armenia named Tigranakert. The others were in Nakhichevan, Artsakh and Utik, the 4 cities being in the old Armenian provinces Aldznik, Goghtn, Utik, Artsakh.

History 
To create this city, Tigranes forced many people out of their homes to make up the population.  Armenia at this time had expanded east to the Caspian Sea, west to central Cappadocia, and south towards Judea, advancing as far as the regions surrounding what is now the Krak des Chevaliers.

The city's markets were filled with traders and merchants doing business from all over the ancient world. Tigranocerta quickly became a very important commercial, as well as cultural center of the Near East. The magnificent theater that was established by the Great King, of which he was an avid devotee, conducted dramas and comedies mostly played by Greek as well as Armenian actors. Plutarch wrote that Tigranocerta was "a rich and beautiful city where every common man and every man of rank studied to adorn it". The Hellenistic culture during the Artaxiad Dynasty had a strong influence and the Greek language was in fact the official language of the court. Tigranes had divided Greater Armenia – the nucleus of the Empire – into four major strategic regions or viceroyalties.

A Roman force under Lucius Licinius Lucullus defeated Tigranes at the Battle of Tigranocerta nearby in 69 BC, and afterwards sacked the city, sending many of the people back to their original homes.

After the plunder, which included the destruction of statues and temples, the city was set ablaze. An abundant quantity of gold and silver was carried off to Rome as war booty. Lucullus took most of the gold and silver from the melted-down statues, pots, cups and other valuable metals and precious stones. During the pillage most of the city's inhabitants fled to the countryside. The newly established theater building was also destroyed in the fire. The great city would never recover from this devastating destruction.

During Pompey the Great's 'conquests of the east', Tigranocerta was retaken briefly by Rome, but was lost when Tigranes the Great was given parts of his kingdom back after his initial surrender to Pompey for the cost of 6,000 talents (an indemnity paid to Rome over an uncertain period). It was again taken by the Romans under Corbulo, during the Roman–Parthian War of 58–63.

During late antiquity Tigranokert was commonly referred to as Chlomaron, which was either another name or the name of a more significant settlement near the ancient one. In 587 during the reign of emperor Maurice, Chlomaron and much of Armenia came under Roman administration after the Romans defeated the Sassanid Persian Empire at the Battle of the Blarathon.

During the Ottoman period, Armenians referred to the city of Diyarbekir as Dikranagerd (Western Armenian pronunciation of Tigranakert).

See also 
 Battle of Tigranocerta

References

Bibliography

External links 
Ancient and premodern Armenia
"Armenia's 12 Capital Cities" Exhibition Opened in Paris

Populated places established in the 1st century BC
Former capitals of Armenia